Wallgau is a municipality in the district of Garmisch-Partenkirchen, in Bavaria, Germany.

Population

Growth 

*Statistics according to the Bavarian government, as of 2007.

Demographics 

*Statistics according to the Bavarian government, as of 2007.

Notable people 

 Magdalena Neuner, (born 1987), twelve-time biathlon world champion, Olympic champion, Biathlon World Cup winner. Neuner has lived in the Bavarian village of Wallgau since birth.

Gallery

References

External links 

 Wallgau.de, official web site
 Woiga.de, unofficial web site for citizens Information in Wallgau

Garmisch-Partenkirchen (district)